Thaton District (Karen: Doo The Htoo ; Pa-O: သထွုံႏခရဲင်ႏ; is a district of the Mon State in Myanmar. The capital is Thaton town. The district covers an area of 5,157 km2, and had a population of 822,172 at the 2014 Census.

Townships
The district contains the following townships:
Thaton Township (pop. 238,106; area 1,236 km2)
Paung Township (pop. 218,459; area 974 km2)
Kyaikto Township (pop. 184,532; area 952 km2)
Bilin Township (pop. 181,075; area 1,995 km2)

References

Districts of Myanmar
Mon State